Taheyya Kariokka also Tahiya Carioca (born Badaweya Mohamed Kareem Ali Elnedany), (February 22, 1915 – September 20, 1999) was an Egyptian belly dancer and film actress.

Early life 
Born in the Egyptian town of Ismaïlia to Mohamed Ali Elnedany and Fatma Elzharaa. Her father was a boat merchant who had married 6 times. It is said that Badawiya's father was around 60 years old during the time her mother was in her early twenties. Badawiya was barely able to speak when her father died. After the death of her father, Badaweya was sent to live with her older half-brother Ahmed Ali Elnedany. While there she was tortured, treated like a slave and locked in chains. Every time she tried to escape he would find her and torture her even more, till one day he shaved her hair.

Career 
With the help of her nephew Osman Elnedany, she escaped to Cairo to stay with Souad Mahasen, a night club owner and an artist. Tahiya had asked several times for employment in Suad's nightclub but Suad refused to employ her due to the disreputability of working at a nightclub. However, many of Suad's associates and friends became acquainted with Tahiya through various visits to Suad's home. They all advised Suad to add her to one of the shows as a chorus girl but still she refused.

Soon, Tahiya was mentioned to Badia Masabni, the owner of Casino Opera, one of the most prominent nightclubs of the time. Badia offered a position in her troupe to Tahiya. Tahiya accepted and was given the stage name Tahiya Mohamed. She soon began gaining popularity as a solo dancer and as she became more experienced she learned a popular Samba dance from Brazil at the time called the Carioca. After that she became known as Tahiya Carioca. Tahiya began starring in movies during what is dubbed as the Egyptian film industry's "Golden Age", such as The Leech, Love and Adoration, and Mother of the Bride. She was a talented dancer, singer, and actress. Kariokka was a film, stage and television actress, she worked on stage in several plays, of her most notable plays was the 1967 black comedy Rubabikia. In 1969, the box-office hit Good Morning, My Dear Wife, starring Salah Zulfikar with Tahiya performing the supporting role, was released to become the highest grossing film of the year. Three years later, in 1972, the film Watch Out for ZouZou, starring Soad Hosni with Tahiya performing the supporting role as well, was released to become the biggest box-office hit in Egyptian cinema to date.

Personal life 
Taheyya married 14 times, some of them included high-profile artistic figures such as actor Rushdy Abaza and playwright Fayez Halawa. She also married a US army officer who took her to the US for a while before they divorced. Tahiya was unable to conceive any children of her own and hence adopted a daughter (Atiyat Allah). Tahiya also was very involved with her sibling's children. Tahiya later moved to London.

Tahyia died of a heart attack on September 20, 1999, aged 84.

Filmography
 Mercedes (1993)
 Iskanderiya, kaman wi kaman (Alexandria Again and Forever) (1990)
 Weda'an Bonapart (Adieu Bonaparte) (1985)
 Saqqa mat, al- (The Water-Carrier Is Dead) (Film, 1977)
El-Karnak, (Karnak Café) (1975)
Sabah El Kheir ya Zawgaty El Aziza- (Good Morning, My Dear Wife) (1969)
Rubabikia (1967) – (play)
The Last-Born (1966)
 Tareek, al- (The Road) (1964)
 Omm el aroussa (Mother of the Bride) (1963)
Hob hatta El-Ebada (Love and Adoration) (1960)
 Shabab Emraa (A Woman's Youth), also known as The Leech (1956)
 Rommel's Treasure (1955)
 Hira wa chebab Ana zanbi eh? (Is It My Fault?) (1953)
 Ibn al ajar (A Child for Rent) (1953)
 Muntasir, El (The Conqueror) (1952)
 Omm el katila, El (The Criminal Mother) (1952)
 Zuhur el fatina, El (The Charming Flowers) (1952)
 Feiruz hanem (Mrs. Feiruz) (1951)
 Ibn el halal (The True-born Son) (1951)
 Khadaini abi (My Father Deceived Me) (1951)
 Akbal el bakari (A Large Family) (1950)
 Ayni bi-triff (My Eye Is Winking) (1950)
 Aheb el raks (I Like Dancing) (1949)
 Amirat el djezira (The Princess of the Island) (1949)
 Katel, El (The Murderer) (1949)
 Mandeel al helu (The Beauty's Veil) (1949)
 Hub wa junun (Love and Madness) (1948)
 Ibn el fellah (The Peasant's Son) (1948)
 Yahia el fann (Long Live Art) (1948)
 Li'bat al sitt (The Lady's Puppet) (1946)
 Ma akdarshi (I Can't Do It) (1946)
 Najaf (1946)
 Sabr tayeb, El (Have Patience) (1946)
 Aheb el baladi (I Like Home Cooking) (1945)
 Hub El awal, El (First Love) (1945)
 Lailat el jumaa (Friday Evening) (1945)
 Naduga (1944)
 Rabiha-takiet el ekhfaa (The Magic Hat) (1944)
 Taqiyyat al ikhfa (1944)
 Ahlam El shabab (Dreams of Youth) (1943)
 Ahib Al ghalat (I Like Mistakes) (1942)

See also
Women in dance

Notes

References

External links
 

Egyptian female dancers
Belly dancers
1915 births
1999 deaths
People from Ismailia
Age controversies